was a Japanese samurai of the Sengoku period. He is known as one of the "Twenty-Four Generals of Takeda Shingen".

He was the eldest son of Sanada Yukitaka, a castle lord in Shinano Province, who by the time of his son's coming-of-age, had pledged his loyalty to the Takeda. During his coming-of-age ceremony, therefore, Sanada Nobutsuna was granted the shin (信) character from Takeda Shingen's name and took the name of Nobutsuna (信綱).
 
During the Battle of Nagashino in 1575, Nobutsuna was killed in combat his younger brother Masateru was also killed. According to Shinchō Kōki, Nobutsuna served as a member of the rearguard in the retreat and was killed.

After Nobutsuna's death his younger brother, Masayuki took the clan leadership. Nobutsuna's daughter Seiin-in was Sanada Nobuyuki (Masayuki's elder son)'s first wife.

References

External links 
  "Legendary Takeda's 24 Generals" at Yamanashi-kankou.jp
 The Samurai Archives The Samurai Archives Japanese History Page.
 Nobutsuna on "Rokumonsen" website in Japanese.

1537 births
1575 deaths
Samurai
Japanese warriors killed in battle
Takeda retainers
Sanada clan